Mr Fox is a British folk rock group.

Mr. Fox may also refer to:

 Fantastic Mr Fox, a children's novel by Roald Dahl
 Fantastic Mr. Fox (film), an animated film based on the children's novel
 Mr. Fox (character), a character in the fairy tale called The Robber Bridegroom
 Mr. Fox (novel), a 2011 novel by Helen Oyeyemi
 Mr. Fox (book), a children's book by Gavin Bishop

See also
 Mrs Fox